Private Dancer is the fifth solo studio album by Tina Turner. It was released on May 29, 1984, through Capitol Records and was her first album released through the label.  

After several challenging years of going solo after divorcing Ike Turner, Private Dancer propelled Turner into becoming a viable solo star, as well as one of the most marketable crossover singers in the recording industry. It became a worldwide commercial success, earning multi-platinum certifications, and remains her best-selling album in North America to date.

In 2020, the album was selected by the Library of Congress for preservation in the National Recording Registry for being "culturally, historically, or aesthetically significant".

Background and production
A&R man John Carter of Capitol Records is credited with relaunching the career of Tina Turner in the 1980s.  In 1983, despite opposition from within Capitol, he signed her and managed her first album for the label, Private Dancer. Recording sessions for the album took place at several studios in England and was overseen by four different production teams, including Rupert Hine, and Martyn Ware of Heaven 17. A radical departure from the rhythm and blues sound Turner had performed with her former husband and performing partner Ike Turner, the tracks in the album are a mixture of uptempos and ballads, inspired by pop and rock genres; it also features elements of smooth jazz and R&B.

"Let's Stay Together" was produced by Martyn Ware of British band Heaven 17. Terry Britten produced the reggae-tinged "What's Love Got to Do with It". Rupert Hine produced "Better Be Good to Me", which had been written by Holly Knight, Mike Chapman, and Nicky Chinn, and most of the other songs.  John Carter produced "Private Dancer", which was written by Mark Knopfler and has a guitar solo by Jeff Beck. "Help!" was recorded with The Crusaders.

Release
The album was released on May 29, 1984, and became an outstanding global commercial success. The album peaked at number three on the Billboard 200 chart for ten consecutive weeks and remained in the top ten for 39 weeks from August 1984 to May 1985. In the United States it was certified 5× platinum. In Germany, the album went 5× gold becoming one of the best selling albums in history. It peaked at number two on the UK Albums Chart, where it was certified 3× platinum, remaining on the charts for 150 total weeks. It was certified 7× platinum for the shipment of over 700,000 copies in Canada by the Canadian Recording Industry Association. The album has sold more than 12 million copies worldwide. At the 1985 Grammy Awards, Private Dancer won four of the six awards for which it was nominated.

In 1997, EMI, the parent label of Capitol Records, released a digitally remastered Centenary Edition of the Private Dancer album on CD, then including four additional demo tracks recorded in late 1983 and early 1984 with the producer John Carter, first released as B-sides to some of the Private Dancer singles, as well as three extended 12" remixes. The album remains the only Tina Turner studio album to have been re-issued in digitally remastered form.

In 2015, the 30th Anniversary edition of this album was released by the Parlophone Records unit of Warner Music Group which now controls this album.

Critical reception

The album received a positive reception from critics. The Los Angeles Times wrote that Turner's voice "melts vinyl". 

Debby Miller, in a July 1984 Rolling Stone review, felt that the album was a powerful comeback, with Turner's voice "rasping but strong", and a range of songs that were all good in a "modern rock setting" that was "neither detached nor very fussy". Robert Christgau of The Village Voice felt that she was able to deliver with honesty the "middlebrow angst of contemporary professional songwriting" and remain in control of an album with four different production teams to give it a "seamless authority". Also noted was Turner's ability to give energy and raw emotion to slickly produced professional pop/rock songs, its long term legacy is that the softening of her raw Southern soul style produced a "landmark" in the "evolution of pop-soul music".

Tour

A 177 date tour to promote the album took place from February 8, 1985, to December 28, 1985. Called the Private Dancer Tour, there were 60 shows in Europe, 105 in North America, 10 in Australia, and 2 in Japan. Opening acts in North America included Glenn Frey and Mr. Mister. As well as songs from the album, Turner performed hits from her time with Ike & Tina, such as "River Deep – Mountain High", "Nutbush City Limits", and "Proud Mary".

Legacy
Alex Henderson, in a retrospective AllMusic review, says that the album was slicker than her R&B classics recorded with Ike & Tina, but she was still able to sing with a throaty passion to deliver her finest solo production. Stephen Holden has written in The New York Times that by using her English producers to soften her raw Southern soul style, discarding the "blaring horns, frenzied percussion and gospel calls and responses", the album became a "landmark" in the "evolution of pop-soul music".

Michael Lydon, in Robert Dimery's 1001 Albums You Must Hear Before You Die, says that the album's lyrical themes embodied her persona of a "tough, sexy woman schooled in a tough world", and that her vocal delivery overcomes the slick production, with her "indomitable soul" unifying the multiple producers. In 1989, the album was ranked number 46 on Rolling Stone magazine's list of The 100 Greatest Albums of the '80s. In 2003, VH1 named Private Dancer the 95th greatest album of all time. Slant Magazine listed the album at number 63 on its list of "Best Albums of the 1980s", saying, "Both a personal liberation and sonic redemption, Private Dancer established Turner not only as a genuine diva, but a bona fide force of nature".

Track listing

US edition

International edition

Remastered editions

Personnel

 Tina Turner – lead vocals (all tracks), background vocals (1, 7, 8)
 Gary Barnacle – saxophone (6)
 Jeff Beck – guitar (8, 9)
 Terry Britten – guitar (2, 3, 4), background vocals (2, 3)
 Graham Broad – drums (4)
 Alex Brown – background vocals (9)
 John Carter – percussion (5)
 Leon "Ndugu" Chancler – drums (9)
 Alan Clark – keyboards (5, 8), percussion (5)
 Mel Collins – saxophone (5)
 David Cullen – string arrangements (10)
 Cy Curnin – background vocals (1, 7)
 Jullian Diggle – percussion (5)
 David Ervin – synthesizer, programming (9)
 Gwen Evans – background vocals (9)
 Charles Fearing – guitar (9)
 Wilton Felder – bass guitar (9), saxophone (9)
 Nick Glennie-Smith – keyboards (2, 3, 4)
 Glenn Gregory – background vocals (6, 10)
 Rupert Hine – bass guitar (1, 7), keyboards (1, 7), percussion, programming (1, 7), background vocals (1, 7)
 Graham Jarvis – Oberheim DX (2, 3)
 John Illsley – bass guitar (5, 8)
 Hal Lindes – guitar (5, 8)
 Billy Livsey – keyboards (2, 3)
 Trevor Morais – drums (1, 7)
 Simon Morton – percussion (2)
 Tessa Niles – background vocals (2, 3)
 Frank Ricotti – percussion (6)
 Ray Russell – guitar (6)
 Joe Sample – synthesizer (9), piano (9)
 David T. Walker – guitar (9)
 Martyn Ware – programming, electronic drums (6, 10), arrangements (6, 10), background vocals (6, 10)
 Greg Walsh – programming (6, 10), arrangements (6, 10)
 Jamie West-Oram – guitar (1, 7)
 Jessica Williams – background vocals (9)
 Terry Williams – drums (5, 8)
 Nick Plytas – piano, synthesizer (6, 10)
 Richie Zito – guitar (8)

Production

 Terry Britten – producer (2, 3, 4)
 John Carter – producer  (5, 8)
 Leon "Ndugu" Chancler – producer  (9)
 Wilton Felder  – producer (9)
 Rupert Hine – producer  (1, 7)
 Joe Sample – producer  (9)
 Greg Walsh – producer & engineer (6, 10)
 Martyn Ware – producer (6, 10)
 F. Byron Clark – engineer (9)
 John Hudson – engineer & mixing (2, 3, 4)
 Walter Samuel – engineer (6, 10)
 Stephen W. Tayler – engineer & mixing (1, 7)
 Humberto Gatica – remixing (5, 8)
 Alan Yoshida – mastering
 Akira Taguchi – compilation producer
 Sam Gay – creative director
 Roy Kohara – art direction
 John O'Brien – design
 Peter Ashworth – photography
 Roger Davies – management
 Chip Lightman – management

Charts

Weekly charts

Year-end charts

Certifications and sales

Grammy Awards

See also
 List of best-selling albums in Germany
 List of best-selling albums by women

References

Bibliography

External links

 Private Dancer (Adobe Flash) at Radio3Net (streamed copy where licensed)

1984 albums
Tina Turner albums
Albums produced by Rupert Hine
Capitol Records albums
United States National Recording Registry albums
United States National Recording Registry recordings